Neelysville is an unincorporated community in Morgan County, in the U.S. state of Ohio.

History
The community was founded by Robert Neeley, and named for him. A post office called Neelysville was established in 1850, and remained in operation until 1907.

References

Unincorporated communities in Morgan County, Ohio
Unincorporated communities in Ohio
1850 establishments in Ohio